Daniel Salmon (born 1994) is a Welsh international lawn and Indoor bowler.

Bowls career
He made his first indoor international appearance aged just 15 in 2010 becoming the youngest person to represent Wales indoors.

In 2017 he reached the final of the open pairs during the 2017 World Indoor Bowls Championship with his playing partner Damian Doubler and won the 2017 World Youth Championships at Broadbeach Bowls Club on Australia’s Gold Coast.

He was selected as part of the Welsh team for the 2018 Commonwealth Games on the Gold Coast in Queensland where he claimed a gold medal in the Pairs with Marc Wyatt.

In 2019 he won the singles bronze medal at the Atlantic Bowls Championships and in 2020 he was selected for the 2020 World Outdoor Bowls Championship in Australia. In 2021, he won the men's triples title at the 2021 Welsh National Bowls Championships.

In 2022, he competed in the men's singles and the men's pairs at the 2022 Commonwealth Games. Salmon won his second consecutive Commonwealth pairs gold medal, but this time partnering Jarrad Breen. Shortly after the Games he went on to claim two national titles by winning both the singles and fours at the Welsh National Championships, bowling for Penylan.

References

Living people
1994 births
Welsh male bowls players
Commonwealth Games gold medallists for Wales
Commonwealth Games medallists in lawn bowls
Bowls players at the 2018 Commonwealth Games
Bowls players at the 2022 Commonwealth Games
Medallists at the 2018 Commonwealth Games
Medallists at the 2022 Commonwealth Games